Drymoluber is a genus of New World snakes of the family Colubridae.

Geographic range
The genus Drymoluber is endemic to South America.

Species
Three species are recognized as being valid.
Drymoluber apurimacensis Lehr, Carrillo & Hocking, 2004
Drymoluber brazili (Gomes, 1918)
Drymoluber dichrous (W. Peters, 1863)

Nota bene: A binomial authority in parentheses indicates that the species was originally described in a genus other than Drymoluber.

Etymology
The specific name, brazili, is in honor of Brazilian herpetologist Vital Brazil.

References

Further reading
Amaral A (1930). "Estudos Sobre Ophidios Neotrópicos. XXII – Sobre a espécie Coluber dichrous (Peters) Boulenger, 1894 ". Memórias do Instituto Butantan 4: 333–337. (Drymoluber, new genus). (in Portuguese). 
Costa, Henrique Caldeira; Moura, Mário Ribeiro; Feio, Renato Neves (2013). "Taxonomic revision of Drymoluber Amaral, 1930 (Serpentes: Colubridae)". Zootaxa 3716 (3): 349–394.
Freiberg M (1982). Snakes of South America. Hong Kong: T.F.H. Publications. 189 pp. . (Drymoluber, pp. 69, 77, 97).

Drymoluber
Snake genera